Theodore H. Von Laue (June 22, 1916 in Frankfurt, Germany – January 22, 2000 in Worcester, Massachusetts) was an American historian and professor emeritus of history at Clark University. He was a winner of Guggenheim Fellowship (1962 and 1974).

After having studied at the University of Freiburg, Germany, in 1937 Von Laue was sent to Princeton University by his father Max von Laue, who did not want him to grow up "in a country run by gangsters". He finished his studies with a PhD about the social legislation of Otto von Bismarck. He then taught at Swarthmore College, the University of California, Riverside, and the Washington University in St. Louis, when he finally became professor of European History at Clark University in Worcester, Massachusetts. He was there from 1970 until his retirement in 1982. In the epitaph of the Clark University he is described as modest, humorous. Not many knew that he was a Quaker, co-initiated the anti-war-movement at Washington University in St. Louis and joined Martin Luther King Jr. in the Selma to Montgomery marches.

One of Von Laue first works has been a biographical study about Leopold von Ranke showing that his "scientific objectivity" was much influenced by the romantics in the 19th century. He then switched to studies of German and especially Russian history, which lead him to consider the influences as the Western Civilization on countries of a different one. An example for this is his book about Sergei Wittes failure to industrialize Russia, blocked by conservative forces including the last Russian tsar Nicholas II. Better known are the following books, which he wrote about this topic: "Why Lenin? Why Stalin?" published in 1964, expanded by "Why Lenin? Why Stalin? Why Gorbachev?" in 1993., and finally his "The World Revolution of Westernization", published in 1987, which, according to the epitaph, by William H. McNeill, the historian from the University of Chicago, was called a fine and wise book — wise in a way few books are. A recension of his book The Global City in 1969 shows that he expected a global confluence, dominated by the West, with problems lasting beyond the 20th century.

Von Laue's view about world history, which he presented in a paper at the conference of the New England Regional World History Association in Bentley College, Waltham, MA, USA, on April 23, 1994, can be summarized in following points:

1. The western civilization is present world wide and its essential elements are dominant almost everywhere. (1. phrase in ch. VI.)

2. Other civilizations have problems to this cultural adaptation; resistance to it, cultural disorientation show up; political instability may lead to dictatorship. (3rd paragraph in ch. VI.)

3. Two contradicting movements arise: a. violent resistance against the foreign influence, and b. the need to use a lot of western elements to improve life conditions by using them peacefully. (6th paragraph in ch. VII.)

4. On top of these world wide problems are the topics of population growth, resources of raw materials, ecology, and climate.  (7th paragraph in ch. VII.)

References

Further reading
Andreas Daum, Hartmut Lehmann, James J. Sheehan, eds., The Second Generation: Émigrés from Nazi Germany as Historians. With a Biobibliographic Guide, New York: Berghahn Books, 2016, including a short biography and list of publications.

1916 births
2000 deaths
20th-century American historians
American male non-fiction writers
Clark University faculty
20th-century American male writers
German emigrants to the United States
University of Freiburg alumni
Princeton University alumni
Swarthmore College faculty
University of California, Riverside faculty
Washington University in St. Louis faculty